This is a list of members of the South Australian Legislative Council from 1938 to 1941.

 LCL MLC Thomas McCallum died on 20 April 1938. Independent candidate Alec Bagot won the resulting by-election on 18 June.
 LCL MLC Hartley Gladstone Hawkins died on 9 July 1939. Labor candidate James Beerworth won the resulting by-election on 2 September.

References
Parliament of South Australia — Statistical Record of the Legislature

Members of South Australian parliaments by term
20th-century Australian politicians